Provia argentata is the only species in the monotypic moth genus Provia of the family Noctuidae. It is found in the US state of Utah. Both the genus and species were first described by William Barnes and James Halliday McDunnough in 1910.

References

Cuculliinae